Lyncina is a genus of sea snails, marine gastropod molluscs in the family Cypraeidae, the cowries.

Species
Species within the genus Lyncina include:
Lyncina aliceae Lum, 2013
 † Lyncina amygdalina (Grateloup, 1846) 
 † Lyncina aquitanica Schilder, 1927 
Lyncina camelopardalis (Perry, 1811)
Lyncina carneola  (Linnaeus, 1758) 
 † Lyncina cingulata Dolin & Lozouet, 2004 
 † Lyncina eristicos Dolin & Lozouet, 2004 
 † Lyncina gourguesi Dolin, 1998 
 † Lyncina imperialis Dolin & Lozouet, 2004 
Lyncina kuroharai (Kuroda & Habe, 1961)
Lyncina leucodon (Broderip, 1832)
Lyncina leviathan Schilder & Schilder, 1937
Lyncina lynx (Linnaeus, 1758)
 † Lyncina maestratii Dolin & Lozouet, 2004 
 † Lyncina magnifica Dolin & Lozouet, 2004 
 † Lyncina miopropinqua Dolin & Lozouet, 2004 
 † Lyncina peyroti (Schilder, 1932) 
 † Lyncina ponderosa Dolin & Lozouet, 2004 
 † Lyncina praemiocaenica (Venzo, 1937) 
 † Lyncina prevostina (Grateloup, 1847) 
 Lyncina propinqua (Garrett, 1879)
Lyncina schilderorum Iredale, 1939
 Lyncina sulcidentata Gray, 1824
 † Lyncina testicula Dolin & Lozouet, 2004 
 † Lyncina titaniana Dolin & Lozouet, 2004 
 † Lyncina tumida (Grateloup, 1834) 
Lyncina ventriculus (Lamarck, 1810)
Lyncina vitellus (Linnaeus, 1758)
Species brought into synonymy
Lyncina argus (Linnaeus, 1758): synonym of Arestorides argus (Linnaeus, 1758)
 Lyncina aurantium (Gmelin, 1791): synonym of Callistocypraea aurantium (Gmelin, 1791)
Lyncina broderipii Gray in Sowerby, 1832: synonym of Callistocypraea broderipii (J. E. Gray in G. B. Sowerby I, 1832)
Lyncina joycae (Clover, 1970): synonym of Raybaudia joycae (Clover, 1970)
 Lyncina leucodon (Broderip, 1828): synonym of Callistocypraea leucodon (Broderip, 1828)
Lyncina nivosa (Broderip, 1827): synonym of Callistocypraea nivosa (Broderip, 1827)
Lyncina porteri (Cate, 1966): synonym of Raybaudia porteri (C. N. Cate, 1966)

References

External links
 Troschel, F. H. (1856-1893). Das Gebiss der Schnecken zur Begründung einer natürlichen Classification. Nicolaische Verlagsbuchhandlung, Berlin.
 Iredale, T. (1930). Queensland molluscan notes, No. 2. Memoirs of the Queensland Museum. 10(1): 73-88, pl. 9
 Jousseaume, F. (1884). Division des Cypraeidae. Le Naturaliste. 6(52): 414-415.

Cypraeidae
Gastropod genera